Ekaterina Petrova Yosifova (4 June 1941 – 13 August 2022) was a Bulgarian educator, journalist and poet.

Life
Yosifova was born in Kyustendil and studied Russian language at the University of Sofia. Yosifova was employed as a high school teacher in Kyustendil and then later as a newspaper editor.

She published Kuso putuvane ('Brief Journey') in 1969 and Noshtem ide vyatur ('The Wind Comes at Night') in 1972. Yosifova became editor-in-chief for Struma, a literary magazine.

Awards

Works 
 1969 – Kuso patuvane ('Short Travel')
 1972 – Noshtem ide vyatar (The Wind Comes at Night')
 1978 – Posveshtenie ('Dedication')
 1983 – Kushta v poleto ('House in the Field') 
 1987 – Imena ('Names')  
 1993 – Podozrenia ('Suspicions')
 1994 – Nenuzhno povedenie ('Useless Conduct')
 1998 – Malko stihotvorenia ('Few Poems')
 2001 – Nishto novo (100 stihotvorenia) ('Nothing New: 100 Poems')
 2004 – Nagore nadolu ('Up and Down')
 2006 – Ratse ('Hands')
 2010 – Tazi zmiya ('This Snake')
 2014 – Tunka knizhka ('Slim Booklet')

Works translated to English 
Her work, translated into English, has appeared in the anthologies:
 Windows on the Black Sea (1992)
 Clay and Star (1992)
 The Manyvoiced Wave: Contemporary Women Poets of Bulgaria, Translators Tsvetelina Ganeva; Richard Scorza, Samkaleen Prakashan, 1999,  
 An Anthology of Contemporary Poetry (1994)

References 

1941 births
2022 deaths
Bulgarian journalists
Bulgarian poets
Bulgarian women journalists
Bulgarian women poets
Bulgarian women writers
Sofia University alumni
People from Kyustendil